Anne Vallaeys (born in 1951) is a French journalist and writer of Belgian origin born in Yangambi, then part of Belgian Congo.

Works 
1983: Les Barcelonnettes, volume 1, Les Jardins de l'Alaméda, with Alain Dugrand, Paris, JC Lattès, 432 p.  - reprint Fayard, 2003
1985: Les Barcelonnettes, volume 2, Terres Chaudes, with Alain Dugrand, JC Lattès, 361 p.  - reprint. Fayard, 2003
1987: Les Barcelonnettes, volume 3, La Soldadera, with Alain Dugrand, JC Lattès, 308 p.  - reprint Fayard, 2003
1989:  Agua Verde, Paris, Payot, 264 p. 
1991: Coup de bambou, Payot, 225 p. 
1993: Sale temps pour les saisons , Paris, Éditions Hoëbeke, 293 p. 
1995: La Bonne Chère, with Paul Bocuse, Paris, Flammarion, 197 p. 
1997: La Mémoire du papillon, Flammarion, series "Gulliver", 213 p. 
1999: Rue de la République, with Alain Dugrand, Paris, Éditions Grasset, 343 p. 
2000: Fontainebleau, la forêt des passions, Paris, Stock, 325 p. 
2002: Les Filles. Chronique d'une année de première, Fayard, 224 p. 
2004: Médecins sans frontières. La Biographie, Fayard, 764 p.  - prix Joseph-Kessel
2007: Indépendance Tcha-Tcha, Fayard, 290 p. .
2008: Dieulefit ou Le Miracle du silence, Fayard, 247 p. 
2008: - Special mention of the 
2010 Edward dans sa jungle, Paris, Fayard, 328 p. 
2013: Le loup est revenu, Fayard, 300 p. 
 Hautes solitudes. Sur les traces des transhumants, Éditions de la Table ronde, 2017, 256 p.

Documentary 
 Patrick Benquet and Anne Vallaeys, L'Aventure MSF, 2006 - prize of the  2007

References

External links 
 Anne Vallaeys on Babelio
 Anne Vallaeys on Fayard
 Anne Vallaeys : Ces histoires de loups frôlent l'hystérie Interview in Midi Libre
 Anne Vallaeys on France Inter
 Anne Vallaeys Le loup symbolise nos questions sur la condition humaine in L'Humanité (15 November 2013)
 Anne Vallaeys, une Belge au Congo on Marianne

20th-century French women writers
21st-century French women writers
20th-century French novelists
21st-century French novelists
20th-century French essayists
21st-century French essayists
20th-century French journalists
Joseph Kessel Prize recipients
1951 births
Living people